Patrick or Pat Griffin may refer to:
Patrick Griffin (academic), Australian professor of education
Patrick Griffin (politician) (1841–?), American politician
Pat Griffin (1944–2019), former Gaelic football player
Pat Griffin (baseball) (1893–1927), pitcher 
Pat Griffin (sledge hockey) (born 1960), Canadian sledge hockey player

See also
Griffin (surname)